Miomir Petrović (1 December 1922 – 22 November 2002) was a Serbian footballer.

Honours
Partizan
 Yugoslav First League: 1948–49

References

External links
 Miomir Petrović at reprezentacija.rs 

1922 births
2002 deaths
People from Negotin
Yugoslav footballers
Yugoslavia international footballers
Serbian footballers
Association football defenders
Yugoslav First League players
SK Jugoslavija players
Red Star Belgrade footballers
FK Partizan players
FK Budućnost Podgorica players